The Louvre, or the Louvre Museum, is the world's most-visited museum, and a historic landmark in Paris, France. It is the home of some of the best-known works of art, including the Mona Lisa and the Venus de Milo. A central landmark of the city, it is located on the Right Bank of the Seine in the city's 1st arrondissement (district or ward). At any given point in time, approximately 38,000 objects from prehistory to the 21st century are being exhibited over an area of 72,735 square meters (782,910 square feet). Attendance in 2022 was 7.8 million visitors, up 170 percent from 2021, but still below the 10.8 million visitors in 2018 before COVID.

The museum is housed in the Louvre Palace, originally built in the late 12th to 13th century under Philip II. Remnants of the Medieval Louvre fortress are visible in the basement of the museum. Due to urban expansion, the fortress eventually lost its defensive function, and in 1546 Francis I converted it into the primary residence of the French Kings. The building was extended many times to form the present Louvre Palace. In 1682, Louis XIV chose the Palace of Versailles for his household, leaving the Louvre primarily as a place to display the royal collection, including, from 1692, a collection of ancient Greek and Roman sculpture. In 1692, the building was occupied by the Académie des Inscriptions et Belles-Lettres and the Académie Royale de Peinture et de Sculpture, which in 1699 held the first of a series of salons. The Académie remained at the Louvre for 100 years. During the French Revolution, the National Assembly decreed that the Louvre should be used as a museum to display the nation's masterpieces.

The museum opened on 10 August 1793 with an exhibition of 537 paintings, the majority of the works being royal and confiscated church property. Because of structural problems with the building, the museum was closed in 1796 until 1801. The collection was increased under Napoleon and the museum was renamed Musée Napoléon, but after Napoleon's abdication, many works seized by his armies were returned to their original owners. The collection was further increased during the reigns of Louis XVIII and Charles X, and during the Second French Empire the museum gained 20,000 pieces. Holdings have grown steadily through donations and bequests since the Third Republic. The collection is divided among eight curatorial departments: Egyptian Antiquities; Near Eastern Antiquities; Greek, Etruscan, and Roman Antiquities; Islamic Art; Sculpture; Decorative Arts; Paintings; Prints and Drawings.

The Musée du Louvre contains more than 380,000 objects and displays 35,000 works of art in eight curatorial departments with more than  dedicated to the permanent collection. The Louvre exhibits sculptures, objets d'art, paintings, drawings, and archaeological finds.

Location and visit

The Louvre museum is located inside the Louvre Palace, in the center of Paris, adjacent to the Tuileries Gardens. The two nearest Métro stations are Louvre-Rivoli and Palais Royal-Musée du Louvre, the latter having a direct underground access to the Carrousel du Louvre commercial mall.

Before the Grand Louvre overhaul of the late 1980s and 1990s, the Louvre had several street-level entrances, most of which are now permanently closed. Since 1993, the museum's main entrance has been the underground space under the Louvre Pyramid, or Hall Napoléon, which can be accessed from the Pyramid itself, from the underground Carrousel du Louvre, or (for authorized visitors) from the  connecting to the nearby rue de Rivoli.

The museum's entrance conditions have varied over time. Initially, artists and foreign visitors had privileged access, a feature that only disappeared in the 1850s. At the time of initial opening in 1793, the French Republican calendar had imposed ten-days "weeks", the first six days of which were reserved for visits by artists and foreigners and the last three for visits by the general public. In the early 1800s, after the seven-day week had been reinstated, the general public had only four hours of museum access per weeks, between 2pm and 4pm on Saturdays and Sundays. In 1824, a new regulation allowed public access only on Sundays and holidays; the other days the museum was open only to artists and foreigners, except for closure on Mondays. That changed in 1855 when the museum became open to the public all days except Mondays. It was free until 1922, when an entrance fee was introduced except on Sundays. Since its post-World War II reopening in 1946, the Louvre has been closed on Tuesdays, and habitually open to the public the rest of the week except for some holidays.

The use of cameras and video recorders is permitted inside, but flash photography is forbidden.

History

Before the museum

The Louvre Palace, which houses the museum, was begun by King Philip II in the late 12th century to protect the city from the attack from the West, as the Kingdom of England still held Normandy at the time. Remnants of the Medieval Louvre are still visible in the crypt. Whether this was the first building on that spot is not known, and it is possible that Philip modified an existing tower.

The origins of the name "Louvre" are somewhat disputed. According to the authoritative Grand Larousse encyclopédique, the name derives from an association with a wolf hunting den (via Latin: lupus, lower Empire: lupara). In the 7th century, Burgundofara (also known as Saint Fare), abbess in Meaux, is said to have gifted part of her "Villa called Luvra situated in the region of Paris" to a monastery, even though it is doubtful that this land corresponded exactly to the present site of the Louvre.

The Louvre Palace has been subject to numerous renovations since its construction. In the 14th century, Charles V converted the building from its military role into a residence. In 1546, Francis I started its rebuilding in French Renaissance style. After Louis XIV chose Versailles as his residence in 1682, construction works slowed to a halt. The royal move away from Paris resulted in the Louvre being used as a residence for artists, under Royal patronage. For example, four generations of craftsmen-artists from the Boulle family were granted Royal patronage and resided in the Louvre.

Meanwhile, the collections of the Louvre originated in the acquisitions of paintings and other artworks by the monarchs of the House of France. At the Palace of Fontainebleau, Francis collected art that would later be part of the Louvre's art collections, including Leonardo da Vinci's Mona Lisa.

The Cabinet du Roi consisted of seven rooms west of the Galerie d'Apollon on the upper floor of the remodeled Petite Galerie. Many of the king's paintings were placed in these rooms in 1673, when it became an art gallery, accessible to certain art lovers as a kind of museum. In 1681, after the court moved to Versailles, 26 of the paintings were transferred there, somewhat diminishing the collection, but it is mentioned in Paris guide books from 1684 on, and was shown to ambassadors from Siam in 1686.

By the mid-18th century there were an increasing number of proposals to create a public gallery in the Louvre. Art critic Étienne La Font de Saint-Yenne in 1747 published a call for a display of the royal collection. On 14 October 1750, Louis XV decided on a display of 96 pieces from the royal collection, mounted in the Galerie royale de peinture of the Luxembourg Palace. A hall was opened by Le Normant de Tournehem and the Marquis de Marigny for public viewing of the "king's paintings" (Tableaux du Roy) on Wednesdays and Saturdays. The Luxembourg gallery included Andrea del Sarto's Charity and works by Raphael; Titian; Veronese; Rembrandt; Poussin or Van Dyck. It closed in 1780 as a result of the royal gift of the Luxembourg palace to the Count of Provence (the future king, Louis XVIII) by the king in 1778. Under Louis XVI, the idea of a royal museum in the Louvre came closer to fruition. The comte d'Angiviller broadened the collection and in 1776 proposed to convert the Grande Galerie of the Louvre – which at that time contained the plans-reliefs or 3D models of key fortified sites in and around France – into the "French Museum". Many design proposals were offered for the Louvre's renovation into a museum, without a final decision being made on them. Hence the museum remained incomplete until the French Revolution.

Revolutionary opening

The Louvre finally became a public museum during the French Revolution. In May 1791, the National Constituent Assembly declared that the Louvre would be "a place for bringing together monuments of all the sciences and arts". On 10 August 1792, Louis XVI was imprisoned and the royal collection in the Louvre became national property. Because of fear of vandalism or theft, on 19 August, the National Assembly pronounced the museum's preparation as urgent. In October, a committee to "preserve the national memory" began assembling the collection for display.

The museum opened on 10 August 1793, the first anniversary of the monarchy's demise, as Muséum central des arts de la République. The public was given free accessibility on three days per week, which was "perceived as a major accomplishment and was generally appreciated". The collection showcased 537 paintings and 184 objects of art. Three quarters were derived from the royal collections, the remainder from confiscated émigrés and Church property (biens nationaux). To expand and organize the collection, the Republic dedicated 100,000 livres per year. In 1794, France's revolutionary armies began bringing pieces from Northern Europe, augmented after the Treaty of Tolentino (1797) by works from the Vatican, such as the Laocoön and Apollo Belvedere, to establish the Louvre as a museum and as a "sign of popular sovereignty".

The early days were hectic. Privileged artists continued to live in residence, and the unlabeled paintings hung "frame to frame from floor to ceiling". The structure itself closed in May 1796 due to structural deficiencies. It reopened on 14 July 1801, arranged chronologically and with new lighting and columns. On 15 August 1797, the Galerie d'Apollon was opened with an exhibition of drawings. Meanwhile, the Louvre's gallery of Antiquity sculpture (musée des Antiques), with artefacts brought from Florence and the Vatican, had opened in November 1800 in Anne of Austria's former summer apartment, located on the ground floor just below the Galerie d'Apollon.

Napoleonic era

On 19 November 1802, Napoleon appointed Dominique Vivant Denon, a scholar and polymath who had participated in the Egyptian campaign of 1798–1801, as the museum's first director, in preference to alternative contenders such as antiquarian Ennio Quirino Visconti, painter Jacques-Louis David, sculptor Antonio Canova and architects Léon Dufourny or Pierre Fontaine. On Denon's suggestion in July 1803, the museum itself was renamed Musée Napoléon.

The collection grew through successful military campaigns. Acquisitions were made of Spanish, Austrian, Dutch, and Italian works, either as the result of war looting or formalized by treaties such as the Treaty of Tolentino. At the end of Napoleon's First Italian Campaign in 1797, the Treaty of Campo Formio was signed with Count Philipp von Cobenzl of the Austrian Monarchy. This treaty marked the completion of Napoleon's conquest of Italy and the end of the first phase of the French Revolutionary Wars. It compelled Italian cities to contribute pieces of art and heritage to Napoleon's "parades of spoils" through Paris before being put into the Louvre Museum. The Horses of Saint Mark, which had adorned the basilica of San Marco in Venice after the sack of Constantinople in 1204, were brought to Paris where they were placed atop Napoleon's Arc de Triomphe du Carrousel in 1797. Under the Treaty of Tolentino, the two statues of the Nile and Tiber were taken to Paris from the Vatican in 1797, and were both kept in the Louvre until 1815. (The Nile was later returned to Rome, whereas the Tiber has remained in the Louvre to this day.) The despoilment of Italian churches and palaces outraged the Italians and their artistic and cultural sensibilities.

After the French defeat at Waterloo, the looted works' former owners sought their return. The Louvre's administrator Denon was loath to comply in absence of a treaty of restitution. In response, foreign states sent emissaries to London to seek help, and many pieces were returned, though far from all. In 1815 Louis XVIII finally concluded agreements with the Austrian government for the keeping of works such as Veronese's Wedding at Cana which was exchanged for a large Le Brun or the repurchase of the Albani collection.

From 1815 to 1852

For most of the 19th century, from Napoleon's time to the Second Empire, the Louvre and other national museums were managed under the monarch's civil list and thus depended much on the ruler's personal involvement. Whereas the most iconic collection remained that of paintings in the Grande Galerie, a number of other initiatives mushroomed in the vast building, named as if they were separate museums even though they were generally managed under the same administrative umbrella. Correspondingly, the museum complex was often referred to in the plural ("") rather than singular.

During the Bourbon Restoration (1814–1830), Louis XVIII and Charles X added to the collections. The Greek and Roman sculpture gallery on the ground floor of the southwestern side of the Cour Carrée was completed on designs by Percier and Fontaine. In 1819 an exhibition of manufactured products was opened in the first floor of the Cour Carrée's southern wing and would stay there until the mid-1820s. The Egyptian collection, initially curated by Jean-François Champollion, formed the basis for what is now the Louvre's Department of Egyptian Antiquities. It was formed from the purchased collections of Edmé-Antoine Durand, Henry Salt and the second collection of Bernardino Drovetti (the first one having been purchased by Victor Emmanuel I of Sardinia to form the core of the present Museo Egizio in Turin). Meanwhile, the French Navy created an exhibition of ship models in the Louvre in December 1827, initially named  in honor of Dauphin Louis Antoine, building on an 18th-century initiative of Henri-Louis Duhamel du Monceau. This collection, renamed  in 1833 and later to develop into the Musée national de la Marine, was initially located on the first floor of the Cour Carrée's North Wing, and in 1838 moved up one level to the 2nd-floor attic, where it remained for more than a century.

Following the July Revolution, King Louis Philippe focused his interest on the repurposing of the Palace of Versailles into a Museum of French History conceived as a project of national reconciliation, and the Louvre was kept in comparative neglect. The Assyrian Museum opened on 1 May 1847. Separately, Louis-Philippe had his Spanish gallery displayed in the Louvre from 7 January 1838, in five rooms on the first floor of the Cour Carrée's East (Colonnade) Wing, but the collection remained his personal property. As a consequence, the works were removed after Louis-Philippe was deposed in 1848, and were eventually auctioned away in 1853.

The short-lived Second Republic had more ambitions for the Louvre. In 1848, the Naval Museum in the Cour Carrée's attic was brought under the common Louvre Museum management, a change which was again reversed in 1920. In 1850 under the leadership of curator Adrien de Longpérier, the musée mexicain opened within the Louvre as the first European museum dedicated to pre-Columbian art.

Second Empire

The rule of Napoleon III was transformational for the Louvre, both the building and the museum. In 1852, he created the Musée des Souverains in the Colonnade Wing, an ideological project aimed at buttressing his personal legitimacy. In 1861, he bought 11,835 artworks including 641 paintings, Greek gold and other antiquities of the Campana collection. For its display, he created another new section within the Louvre named , occupying a number of rooms in various parts of the building. Between  1852 and 1870, the museum added 20,000 new artefacts to its collections.

The main change of that period was to the building itself. In the 1850s architects Louis Visconti and Hector Lefuel created massive new spaces around what is now called the Cour Napoléon, some of which (in the South Wing, now Aile Denon) went to the museum.

From 1870 to 1981

The Louvre narrowly escaped serious damage during the suppression of the Paris Commune. On 23 May 1871, as the French Army advanced into Paris, a force of Communards led by  set fire to the adjoining Tuileries Palace. The fire burned for forty-eight hours, entirely destroying the interior of the Tuileries and spreading to the north west wing of the museum next to it.  The emperor's Louvre library (Bibliothèque du Louvre) and some of the adjoining halls, in what is now the Richelieu Wing, were separately destroyed. But the museum was saved by the efforts of Paris firemen and museum employees led by curator Henry Barbet de Jouy.

Following the end of the monarchy, several spaces in the Louvre's South Wing went to the museum. The Salle du Manège was transferred to the museum in 1879, and in 1928 became its main entrance lobby. Edomond Guillaume also decorated the first-floor room at the northwest corner of the Cour Carrée, on the ceiling of which he placed in 1890 a monumental painting by Carolus-Duran, The Triumph of Marie de' Medici originally created in 1879 for the Luxembourg Palace.

Meanwhile, during the Third Republic (1870–1940) the Louvre acquired new artefacts mainly via donations, gifts, and sharing arrangements on excavations abroad. The 583-item , donated in 1869 by Louis La Caze, included works by Chardin; Fragonard, Rembrandt and Watteau. In 1883, the Winged Victory of Samothrace, which had been found in the Aegean Sea in 1863, was prominently displayed as the focal point of the Escalier Daru. Major artifacts excavated at Susa in Iran, including the massive Apadana capital and glazed brick decoration from the Palace of Darius there, accrued to the Oriental (Near Eastern) Antiquities Department in the 1880s. The Société des amis du Louvre was established in 1897 and donated prominent works, such as the Pietà of Villeneuve-lès-Avignon. The expansion of the museum and its collections slowed after World War I, however, despite some prominent acquisitions such as Georges de La Tour's Saint Thomas and Baron Edmond de Rothschild's 1935 donation of 4,000 prints, 3,000 drawings, and 500 illustrated books.

From the late 19th century, the Louvre gradually veered away from its mid-century ambition of universality to become a more focused museum of French, Western and Near Eastern art, covering a space ranging from Iran to the Atlantic. The collections of the Louvre's musée mexicain were transferred to the Musée d'Ethnographie du Trocadéro in 1887. The Musée de Marine itself was relocated to the Palais de Chaillot in 1943. The Louvre's extensive collections of Asian art were moved to the Guimet Museum in 1945. Nevertheless, the Louvre's first gallery of Islamic art opened in 1922.

In the late 1920s, Louvre Director Henri Verne devised a master plan for the rationalization of the museum's exhibitions, which was partly implemented in the following decade. In 1932–1934, Louvre architects  and Albert Ferran redesigned the Escalier Daru to its current appearance. The  in the South Wing was covered by a glass roof in 1934. Decorative arts exhibits were expanded in the first floor of the North Wing of the Cour Carrée, including some of France's first period room displays.

During World War II, the Louvre conducted an elaborate plan of evacuation of its art collection. When Germany occupied the Sudetenland, many important artworks such as the Mona Lisa were temporarily moved to the Château de Chambord. When war was formally declared a year later, most of the museum's paintings were sent there as well. Select sculptures such as Winged Victory of Samothrace and the Venus de Milo were sent to the Château de Valençay. On 27 August 1939, after two days of packing, truck convoys began to leave Paris. By 28 December, the museum was cleared of most works, except those that were too heavy and "unimportant paintings [that] were left in the basement". In early 1945, after the liberation of France, art began returning to the Louvre.

New arrangements after the war revealed the further evolution of taste away from the lavish decorative practices of the late 19th century. Around 1950, Louvre architect  streamlined the interior decoration of the Grande Galerie. In the late 1960s, seats designed by Pierre Paulin were installed in the Grande Galerie. In 1972, the 's museography was remade with lighting from a hung tubular case, designed by Louvre architect  with assistance from designers , Joseph-André Motte and Paulin.

In 1961, the Finance Ministry accepted to leave the Pavillon de Flore at the southwestern end of the Louvre building, as Verne had recommended in his 1920s plan. New exhibition spaces of sculptures (ground floor) and paintings (first floor) opened there later in the 1960s, on a design by government architect Olivier Lahalle.

Grand Louvre

In 1981, French President François Mitterrand proposed, as one of his Grands Projets, the Grand Louvre plan to relocate the Finance Ministry, until then housed in the North Wing of the Louvre, and thus devote almost the entire Louvre building (except its northwestern tip, which houses the separate Musée des Arts Décoratifs) to the museum which would be correspondingly restructured. In 1984 I. M. Pei, the architect personally selected by Mitterrand, proposed a master plan including an underground entrance space accessed through a glass pyramid in the Louvre's central Cour Napoléon.

The open spaces surrounding the pyramid were inaugurated on 15 October 1988, and its underground lobby was opened on 30 March 1989. New galleries of early modern French paintings on the 2nd floor of the Cour Carrée, for which the planning had started before the Grand Louvre, also opened in 1989. Further rooms in the same sequence, designed by Italo Rota, opened on 15 December 1992.

On 18 November 1993, Mitterrand inaugurated the next major phase of the Grand Louvre plan: the renovated North (Richelieu) Wing in the former Finance Ministry site, the museum's largest single expansion in its entire history, designed by Pei, his French associate Michel Macary, and Jean-Michel Wilmotte. Further underground spaces known as the Carrousel du Louvre, centered on the Inverted Pyramid and designed by Pei and Macary, had opened in October 1993. Other refurbished galleries, of Italian sculptures and Egyptian antiquities, opened in 1994. The third and last main phase of the plan unfolded mainly in 1997, with new renovated rooms in the Sully and Denon wings. A new entrance at the porte des Lions opened in 1998, leading on the first floor to new rooms of Spanish paintings.

As of 2002, the Louvre's visitor count had doubled from its pre-Grand-Louvre levels.

21st century

President Jacques Chirac, who had succeeded Mitterrand in 1995, insisted on the return of non-Western art to the Louvre, upon a recommendation from his friend the art collector and dealer .

The main other initiative in the aftermath of the Grand Louvre project was Chirac's decision to create a new department of Islamic Art, by executive order of 1 August 2003, and to move the corresponding collections from their prior underground location in the Richelieu Wing to a more prominent site in the Denon Wing. That new section opened on 22 September 2012, together with collections from the Roman-era Eastern Mediterranean, with financial support from the Al Waleed bin Talal Foundation and on a design by Mario Bellini and Rudy Ricciotti.

In 2007, German painter Anselm Kiefer was invited to create a work for the North stairs of the Perrault Colonnade, Athanor. This decision announces the museum's reengagement with contemporary art under the direction of Henri Loyrette, fifty years after the institution's last order to a contemporary artists, George Braque. 

The room's floor and walls were redesigned in 2021 by Louvre architect Michel Goutal to revert the changes made by his predecessor Albert Ferran in the late 1930s, triggering protests from the Cy Twombly Foundation on grounds that the then-deceased painter's work had been created to fit with the room's prior decoration.

That same year, the Louvre commissioned French artist François Morellet to create a work for the Lefuel stairs, on the first floor. For L'esprit d'escalier Morellet redesigned the stairscase's windows, echoing their original structures but distorting them to create a disturbing optical effect.

On 6 June 2014, the Decorative Arts section on the first floor of the Cour Carrée's northern wing opened after comprehensive refurbishment.

In January 2020, under the direction of Jean-Luc Martinez, the museum inaugurated a new contemporary art commission, L'Onde du Midi by Venezuelan kinetic artist Elias Crespin. The sculpture hovers under the Escalier du Midi, the staircase on the South of the Perrault Colonnade.

The Louvre, like many other museums and galleries, felt the impact of the COVID-19 pandemic on the arts and cultural heritage. It was closed for six months during French coronavirus lockdowns and saw visitor numbers plunge to 2.7 million in 2020, from 9.6 million in 2019 and 10.2 million in 2018, which was a record year.

Collections
The Musée du Louvre owns 615,797 objects of which 482,943 are accessible online since 24 March 2021 and displays 35,000 works of art in eight curatorial departments.

Egyptian antiquities

The department, comprising over 50,000 pieces, includes artifacts from the Nile civilizations which date from 4,000 BC to the 4th century AD. The collection, among the world's largest, overviews Egyptian life spanning Ancient Egypt, the Middle Kingdom, the New Kingdom, Coptic art, and the Roman, Ptolemaic, and Byzantine periods.

The department's origins lie in the royal collection, but it was augmented by Napoleon's 1798 expeditionary trip with Dominique Vivant, the future director of the Louvre. After Jean-François Champollion translated the Rosetta Stone, Charles X decreed that an Egyptian Antiquities department be created. Champollion advised the purchase of three collections, formed by Edmé-Antoine Durand, Henry Salt, and Bernardino Drovet; these additions added 7,000 works. Growth continued via acquisitions by Auguste Mariette, founder of the Egyptian Museum in Cairo. Mariette, after excavations at Memphis, sent back crates of archaeological finds including The Seated Scribe.

Guarded by the Great Sphinx of Tanis, the collection is housed in more than 20 rooms. Holdings include art, papyrus scrolls, mummies, tools, clothing, jewelry, games, musical instruments, and weapons. Pieces from the ancient period include the Gebel el-Arak Knife from 3400 BC, The Seated Scribe, and the Head of King Djedefre. Middle Kingdom art, "known for its gold work and statues", moved from realism to idealization; this is exemplified by the schist statue of Amenemhatankh and the wooden Offering Bearer. The New Kingdom and Coptic Egyptian sections are deep, but the statue of the goddess Nephthys and the limestone depiction of the goddess Hathor demonstrate New Kingdom sentiment and wealth.

Near Eastern antiquities
Near Eastern antiquities, the second newest department, dates from 1881 and presents an overview of early Near Eastern civilization and "first settlements", before the arrival of Islam. The department is divided into three geographic areas: the Levant, Mesopotamia (Iraq), and Persia (Iran). The collection's development corresponds to archaeological work such as Paul-Émile Botta's 1843 expedition to Khorsabad and the discovery of Sargon II's palace. These finds formed the basis of the Assyrian museum, the precursor to today's department.

The museum contains exhibits from Sumer and the city of Akkad, with monuments such as the Prince of Lagash's Stele of the Vultures from 2450 BC and the stele erected by Naram-Sin, King of Akkad, to celebrate a victory over barbarians in the Zagros Mountains. The  Code of Hammurabi, discovered in 1901, displays Babylonian Laws prominently, so that no man could plead their ignorance. The 18th-century BC mural of the Investiture of Zimrilim and the 25th-century BC Statue of Ebih-Il found in the ancient city-state of Mari are also on display at the museum.

A significant portion of the department covers the ancient Levant, including the Eshmunazar II sarcophagus discovered in 1855, which catalyzed Ernest Renan's 1860 Mission de Phénicie. It contains one of the world's largest and most comprehensive collections of Canaanite and Aramaic inscriptions. The section also covers North African Punic antiquities (Punic = Western Phoenician), given the significant French presence in the region in the 19th century, with early finds including the 1843 discovery of the Ain Nechma inscriptions.

The Persian portion of Louvre contains work from the archaic period, like the Funerary Head and the Persian Archers of Darius I. This section also contains rare objects from Persepolis which were also lent to the British Museum for its Ancient Persia exhibition in 2005.

Greek, Etruscan, and Roman

The Greek, Etruscan, and Roman department displays pieces from the Mediterranean Basin dating from the Neolithic to the 6th century. The collection spans from the Cycladic period to the decline of the Roman Empire. This department is one of the museum's oldest; it began with appropriated royal art, some of which was acquired under Francis I. Initially, the collection focused on marble sculptures, such as the Venus de Milo'''. Works such as the Apollo Belvedere arrived during the Napoleonic Wars, but these pieces were returned after Napoleon I's fall in 1815. In the 19th century, the Louvre acquired works including vases from the Durand collection, bronzes such as the Borghese Vase from the Bibliothèque nationale.

The archaic is demonstrated by jewellery and pieces such as the limestone Lady of Auxerre, from 640 BC; and the cylindrical Hera of Samos, c. 570–560 BC.Hannan, p. 252 After the 4th century BC, focus on the human form increased, exemplified by the Borghese Gladiator. The Louvre holds masterpieces from the Hellenistic era, including The Winged Victory of Samothrace (190 BC) and the Venus de Milo, symbolic of classical art. The long Galerie Campana displays an outstanding collection of more than one thousand Greek potteries. In the galleries paralleling the Seine, much of the museum's Roman sculpture is displayed. The Roman portraiture is representative of that genre; examples include the portraits of Agrippa and Annius Verus; among the bronzes is the Greek Apollo of Piombino.

Islamic art
The Islamic art collection, the museum's newest, spans "thirteen centuries and three continents". These exhibits, of ceramics, glass, metalware, wood, ivory, carpet, textiles, and miniatures, include more than 5,000 works and 1,000 shards. Originally part of the decorative arts department, the holdings became separate in 2003. Among the works are the Pyxide d'al-Mughira, a 10th century ivory box from Andalusia; the Baptistery of Saint-Louis, an engraved brass basin from the 13th or 14th century Mamluk period; and the 10th century Shroud of Saint-Josse from Iran. The collection contains three pages of the Shahnameh, an epic book of poems by Ferdowsi in Persian, and a Syrian metalwork named the Barberini Vase. In September 2019, a new and improved Islamic art department was opened by Princess Lamia bint Majed Al Saud. The new department exhibits 3,000 pieces were collected from Spain to India via the Arabian peninsula dating from the 7th to the 19th centuries.

Sculptures

The sculpture department consists of works created before 1850 not belonging in the Etruscan, Greek, and Roman department. The Louvre has been a repository of sculpted material since its time as a palace; however, only ancient architecture was displayed until 1824, except for Michelangelo's Dying Slave and Rebellious Slave. Initially the collection included only 100 pieces, the rest of the royal sculpture collection being at Versailles. It remained small until 1847, when Léon Laborde was given control of the department. Laborde developed the medieval section and purchased the first such statues and sculptures in the collection, King Childebert and stanga door, respectively. The collection was part of the Department of Antiquities but was given autonomy in 1871 under Louis Courajod, a director who organized a wider representation of French works. In 1986, all post-1850 works were relocated to the new Musée d'Orsay. The Grand Louvre project separated the department into two exhibition spaces; the French collection is displayed in the Richelieu Wing, and foreign works in the Denon Wing.

The collection's overview of French sculpture contains Romanesque works such as the 11th-century Daniel in the Lions' Den and the 12th-century Virgin of Auvergne. In the 16th century, Renaissance influence caused French sculpture to become more restrained, as seen in Jean Goujon's bas-reliefs, and Germain Pilon's Descent from the Cross and Resurrection of Christ. The 17th and 18th centuries are represented by Gian Lorenzo Bernini's 1640–1 Bust of Cardinal Richelieu, Étienne Maurice Falconet's Woman Bathing and Amour menaçant, and François Anguier's obelisks. Neoclassical works includes Antonio Canova's Psyche Revived by Cupid's Kiss (1787). The 18th and 19th centuries are represented by the French sculptors like  Alfred Barye and Émile Guillemin.

Decorative arts

The Objets d'art collection spans the time from the Middle Ages to the mid-19th century. The department began as a subset of the sculpture department, based on royal property and the transfer of work from the Basilique Saint-Denis, the burial ground of French monarchs that held the Coronation Sword of the Kings of France. Among the budding collection's most prized works were pietre dure vases and bronzes. The Durand collection's 1825 acquisition added "ceramics, enamels, and stained glass", and 800 pieces were given by Pierre Révoil. The onset of Romanticism rekindled interest in Renaissance and Medieval artwork, and the Sauvageot donation expanded the department with 1,500 middle-age and faïence works. In 1862, the Campana collection added gold jewelry and maiolicas, mainly from the 15th and 16th centuries.

The works are displayed on the Richelieu Wing's first floor and in the Apollo Gallery, named by the painter Charles Le Brun, who was commissioned by Louis XIV (the Sun King) to decorate the space in a solar theme. The medieval collection contains the coronation crown of Louis XIV, Charles V's sceptre, and the 12th century porphyry vase. The Renaissance art holdings include Giambologna's bronze Nessus and Deianira and the tapestry Maximillian's Hunt. From later periods, highlights include Madame de Pompadour's Sèvres vase collection and Napoleon III's apartments.

In September 2000, the Louvre Museum dedicated the Gilbert Chagoury and Rose-Marie Chagoury Gallery to display tapestries donated by the Chagourys, including a 16th-century six-part tapestry suite, sewn with gold and silver threads representing sea divinities, which was commissioned in Paris for Colbert de Seignelay, Secretary of State for the Navy.

Painting

The painting collection has more than 7,500 works from the 13th century to 1848 and is managed by 12 curators who oversee the collection's display. Nearly two-thirds are by French artists, and more than 1,200 are Northern European. The Italian paintings compose most of the remnants of Francis I and Louis XIV's collections, others are unreturned artwork from the Napoleon era, and some were bought. The collection began with Francis, who acquired works from Italian masters such as Raphael and Michelangelo and brought Leonardo da Vinci to his court. After the French Revolution, the Royal Collection formed the nucleus of the Louvre. When the d'Orsay train station was converted into the Musée d'Orsay in 1986, the collection was split, and pieces completed after the 1848 Revolution were moved to the new museum. French and Northern European works are in the Richelieu Wing and Cour Carrée; Spanish and Italian paintings are on the first floor of the Denon Wing.

Exemplifying the French School are the early Avignon Pietà of Enguerrand Quarton; the anonymous painting of King Jean le Bon ( 1360), possibly the oldest independent portrait in Western painting to survive from the postclassical era; Hyacinthe Rigaud's Louis XIV; Jacques-Louis David's The Coronation of Napoleon; Théodore Géricault's The Raft of the Medusa; and Eugène Delacroix's Liberty Leading the People. Nicolas Poussin, the Le Nain brothers, Philippe de Champaigne, Le Brun, La Tour, Watteau, Fragonard, Ingres, Corot, and Delacroix are well represented.

Northern European works include Johannes Vermeer's The Lacemaker and The Astronomer; Caspar David Friedrich's The Tree of Crows; Rembrandt's The Supper at Emmaus, Bathsheba at Her Bath, and The Slaughtered Ox.

The Italian holdings are notable, particularly the Renaissance collection. The works include Andrea Mantegna and Giovanni Bellini's Calvarys, which reflect realism and detail "meant to depict the significant events of a greater spiritual world". The High Renaissance collection includes Leonardo da Vinci's Mona Lisa, Virgin and Child with St. Anne, St. John the Baptist, and Madonna of the Rocks. The Baroque collection includes Giambattista Pittoni's The Continence of Scipio, Susanna and the Elders, Bacchus and Ariadne, Mars and Venus, and others Caravaggio is represented by The Fortune Teller and Death of the Virgin. From 16th century Venice, the Louvre displays Titian's Le Concert Champetre, The Entombment, and The Crowning with Thorns.

The La Caze Collection, a bequest to the Musée du Louvre in 1869 by Louis La Caze, was the largest contribution of a person in the history of the Louvre. La Caze gave 584 paintings of his personal collection to the museum. The bequest included Antoine Watteau's Commedia dell'arte player of Pierrot ("Gilles"). In 2007, this bequest was the topic of the exhibition "1869: Watteau, Chardin... entrent au Louvre. La collection La Caze".

Some of the best known paintings of the museum have been digitized by the French Center for Research and Restoration of the Museums of France.

Prints and drawings
The prints and drawings department encompasses works on paper. The origins of the collection were the 8,600 works in the Royal Collection (Cabinet du Roi), which were increased via state appropriation, purchases such as the 1,200 works from Fillipo Baldinucci's collection in 1806, and donations. The department opened on 5 August 1797, with 415 pieces displayed in the Galerie d'Apollon. The collection is organized into three sections: the core Cabinet du Roi, 14,000 royal copper printing-plates, and the donations of Edmond de Rothschild, which include 40,000 prints, 3,000 drawings, and 5,000 illustrated books. The holdings are displayed in the Pavillon de Flore; due to the fragility of the paper medium, only a portion are displayed at one time.

Management, administration, partnerships

The Louvre is owned by the French government. Since the 1990s, its management and governance have been made more independent. Since 2003, the museum has been required to generate funds for projects. By 2006, government funds had dipped from 75 percent of the total budget to 62 percent. Every year, the Louvre now raises as much as it gets from the state, about €122 million. The government pays for operating costs (salaries, safety, and maintenance), while the rest – new wings, refurbishments, acquisitions – is up to the museum to finance. A further €3 million to €5 million a year is raised by the Louvre from exhibitions that it curates for other museums, while the host museum keeps the ticket money. As the Louvre became a point of interest in the book The Da Vinci Code and the 2006 film based on the book, the museum earned $2.5 million by allowing filming in its galleries.Lunn, p. 137 In 2008, the French government provided $180 million of the Louvre's yearly $350 million budget; the remainder came from private contributions and ticket sales.

The Louvre employs a staff of 2,000 led by Director Jean-Luc Martinez, who reports to the French Ministry of Culture and Communications. Martinez replaced Henri Loyrette in April 2013. Under Loyrette, who replaced Pierre Rosenberg in 2001, the Louvre has undergone policy changes that allow it to lend and borrow more works than before. In 2006, it loaned 1,300 works, which enabled it to borrow more foreign works. From 2006 to 2009, the Louvre lent artwork to the High Museum of Art in Atlanta, Georgia, and received a $6.9 million payment to be used for renovations.

In 2013, his successor Aurélie Filippetti announced that the Louvre would move more than 250,000 works of art held in a  basement storage area in Liévin; the cost of the project, estimated at €60 million, will be split between the region (49%) and the Louvre (51%). The Louvre will be the sole owner and manager of the store. In July 2015, a team led by British firm Rogers Stirk Harbour + Partners was selected to design the complex, which will have light-filled work spaces under one vast, green roof.

In 2012, the Louvre and the Fine Arts Museums of San Francisco announced a five-year collaboration on exhibitions, publications, art conservation and educational programming. The €98.5 million expansion of the Islamic Art galleries in 2012 received state funding of €31 million, as well as €17 million from the Alwaleed Bin Talal Foundation founded by the eponymous Saudi prince. The Republic of Azerbaijan, the Emir of Kuwait, the Sultan of Oman and King Mohammed VI of Morocco donated in total €26 million. In addition, the opening of the Louvre Abu Dhabi is supposed to provide €400 million over the course of 30 years for its use of the museum's brand. Loyrette has tried to improve weak parts of the collection through income generated from loans of art and by guaranteeing that "20% of admissions receipts will be taken annually for acquisitions". He has more administrative independence for the museum and achieved 90 percent of galleries to be open daily, as opposed to 80 percent previously. He oversaw the creation of extended hours and free admission on Friday nights and an increase in the acquisition budget to $36 million from $4.5 million.

In March 2018, an exhibition of dozens of artworks and relics belonging to France's Louvre Museum was opened to visitors in Tehran, as a result of an agreement between Iranian and French presidents in 2016. In the Louvre, two departments were allocated to the antiquities of the Iranian civilization, and the managers of the two departments visited Tehran. Relics belonging to Ancient Egypt, Rome and Mesopotamia as well as French royal items were showcased at the Tehran exhibition."Louvre lends art to Tehran for 'unprecedented' show". France24, 5 March 2018.

Iran's National Museum building was designed and constructed by French architect André Godard. Following its time in Tehran, the exhibition is set to be held in the Khorasan Grand Museum in Mashhad, northeastern Iran in June 2018.

On the 500th anniversary of Leonardo da Vinci's death, the Louvre held the largest ever single exhibit of his work, from 24 October 2019 to 24 February 2020. The event included over a hundred items: paintings, drawings and notebooks. A full 11 of the fewer than 20 paintings that Da Vinci completed in his lifetime were displayed. Five of them are owned by the Louvre, but the Mona Lisa was not included because it is in such great demand among visitors to the Louvre museum; the work remained on display in its gallery. Salvator Mundi was also not included since the Saudi owner did not agree to move the work from its hiding place. Vitruvian Man, however, was on display, after a successful legal battle with its owner, the Galleria dell'Accademia in Venice.

In 2021, a Renaissance era ceremonial helmet and breastplate stolen from the museum in 1983 were recovered. The museum noted that the 1983 theft had "deeply troubled all the staff at the time." There are few publicly accessible details on the theft itself.

In May 2021, it was announced that Laurence des Cars has been picked by French president Emmanuel Macron as the next leader of the Louvre. For the first time in its 228-year history, the Louvre will be directed by a woman.
During the COVID-19 pandemic, the Louvre has launched a platform where most of its works, including those that are not on display, can be seen. The new platform, collections.louvre.fr, already has more than 482,000 illustrated records – representing 75% of its rich and varied collections.

Archaeological research

The Louvre's ancient art collections are to a significant extent the product of excavations, some of which the museum sponsored under various legal regimes over time, often as a companion to France's diplomacy and/or colonial enterprises.
 Louis-François-Sébastien Fauvel in Greece (1818)
 Jean-François Champollion in Egypt (1828-1829)
 Guillaume-Abel Blouet and Léon-Jean-Joseph Dubois with the Morea expedition in Greece (1829)
  in Algeria (1842-1845)
 Paul-Émile Botta in the Nineveh Plains (1845)
  in Cyrenaica (1850)
 Auguste Mariette in Egypt (1850-1854)
 Victor Langlois in Cilicia (1852)
 Ernest Renan with the Mission de Phénicie following the 1860 civil conflict in Mount Lebanon and Damascus (1860-1861)
 Léon Heuzey and Honoré Daumet in Macedonia (1861)
 Eugène-Melchior de Vogüé and Edmond Duthoit in Cyprus (1863-1866)
 Charles Champoiseau in Samothrace (1863)
  in Thessaloniki and Thasos (1864-1865)
 Olivier Rayet and Albert-Félix-Théophile Thomas in Ionia (1872-1873)
 Charles Simon Clermont-Ganneau in Palestine (1873)
  in Algeria and Tunisia (1874)
 Ernest de Sarzec in Tello / ancient Girsu, Mesopotamia (1877-1900)
 Paul Girard in Greece (1881)
 Edmond Pottier, Salomon Reinach and Alphonse Veyries in Myrina (Aeolis) (1872-1873)
 Marcel-Auguste Dieulafoy and Jane Dieulafoy in Susa, Persia (1884-1886)
 Charles Huber in Tayma, Arabia (1885)
 Alfred Charles Auguste Foucher in India and present-day Pakistan (1895-1897)
 Jacques de Morgan in Susa (1897)
 Gaston Cros in Tello / ancient Girsu (1902)
 Paul Pelliot in Chinese Turkestan (1907-1909)
 Maurice Pézard in Northern Palestine (1923)
 Georges Aaron Bénédite in Egypt (1926)
 François Thureau-Dangin in Northern Syria (1929)
 Henri de Genouillac in Mesopotamia (1912, 1929)
 the Institut Français d'Archéologie Orientale in Cairo, created in 1880
The rest of the plaque combines donors of archaeological items, many of whom were archaeologists themselves, and other archaeologists whose excavations contributed to the Louvre's collections: 
  in France (1899)
 Édouard Piette in France (1902)
  in France (1899-1906)
 Henri and Jacques de Morgan in Susa (1909-1910)
  (1906-1920) and his daughter Germaine in France (1976) 
  in France (1929)
  and his wife Suzanne in France (1935)
 Fernand Bisson de la Roque in Egypt (1922-1950)
 Bernard Bruyère in Egypt (1920-1951)
 Raymond Weill in Egypt (1952)
 Pierre Montet in Egypt (1921-1956)
  in the Indus Valley and Afghanistan (1950-1973)
  in France (1973)
 André Parrot in Mari, Syria (1931-1974)
 Claude Frédéric-Armand Schaeffer in Ugarit, Syria (1929-1970)
 Roman Ghirshman in Iraq and Iran (1931-1972)

Satellites and offshoots
Several museums in and outside France have been or are placed under the Louvre's administrative authority or linked to it through exclusive partnerships, while not being located in the Louvre Palace.

Musée de Cluny (1926-1977)

In February 1926, the Musée de Cluny, whose creation dates back to the 19th century, was brought under the aegis of the Louvre's department of decorative arts. That affiliation was terminated in 1977.

Musée du Jeu de Paume (1947-1986)

The  building in the Tuileries Garden, initially intended as a sports venue, was repurposed from 1909 as an art gallery. In 1947, it became the exhibition space for the Louvre's collections of late 19th and early 20th paintings, most prominently Impressionism, as the Louvre Palace was lacking space to display them, and was consequently brought under direct management by the Louvre's . In 1986, these collections were transferred to the newly created Musée d'Orsay.

Gypsothèque du Louvre (since 2001)
The  (plaster cast gallery) of the Louvre is a collection of plaster casts that was formed in 1970 by the reunion of the corresponding inventories of the Louvre, the Beaux-Arts de Paris and the Art and Archaeology Institute of the Sorbonne University, the latter two following depredations during the May 68 student unrest.

Musée Delacroix (since 2004)

The small museum located in Eugène Delacroix's former workshop in central Paris, created in the 1930s, has been placed under management by the Louvre since 2004.

Louvre-Lens (since 2012)

The Louvre-Lens follows a May 2003 initiative by then culture minister Jean-Jacques Aillagon to promote cultural projects outside of Paris that would make the riches of major Parisian institutions available to a broader French public, including a satellite of the Louvre. Japanese architects SANAA and landscape architect Catherine Mosbach were respectively selected in September 2005 to design the museum building and garden. The Louvre-Lens has been successful at attracting around 500,000 visitors per year until the COVID-19 pandemic.

Louvre Abu Dhabi (since 2017)

The Louvre Abu Dhabi is a separate entity from the Louvre, but the two entities have a multifaceted contractual relationship that allows the Emirati museum to use the Louvre name until 2037, and to exhibit artworks from the Louvre until 2027. A 30-year agreement, signed in early 2007 by French Culture Minister Renaud Donnedieu de Vabres and Sheik Sultan bin Tahnoon Al Nahyan, establishes that Abu Dhabi shall pay €832,000,000 (US$1.3 billion) in exchange for the Louvre name use, managerial advice, art loans, and special exhibitions. The Louvre Abu Dhabi is located on Saadiyat Island and was designed by the French architect Jean Nouvel and engineering firm of Buro Happold. It occupies  and is covered by an iconic metallic dome designed to cast rays of light mimicking sunlight passing through date palm fronds in an oasis. The French art loans, expected to total between 200 and 300 artworks during a 10-year period, come from multiple museums, including the Louvre, the Centre Georges Pompidou, the Musée d'Orsay, Versailles, the Guimet Museum, the Musée Rodin, and the Musée du quai Branly.

Controversy
The Louvre is involved in controversies that surround cultural property seized under Napoleon I, as well as during World War II by the Nazis. During Nazi occupation, thousands of artworks were stolen. But after the war, 61,233 articles on more than 150,000 seized artworks returned to France and were assigned to the Office des Biens Privés. In 1949, it entrusted 2,130 unclaimed pieces (including 1,001 paintings) to the Direction des Musées de France in order to keep them under appropriate conditions of conservation until their restitution and meanwhile classified them as MNRs (Musées Nationaux Recuperation or, in English, the National Museums of Recovered Artwork). Some 10% to 35% of the pieces are believed to come from Jewish spoliations and until the identification of their rightful owners, which declined at the end of the 1960s, they are registered indefinitely on separate inventories from the museum's collections.

They were exhibited in 1946 and shown all together to the public during four years (1950–1954) in order to allow rightful claimants to identify their properties, then stored or displayed, according to their interest, in several French museums including the Louvre. From 1951 to 1965, about 37 pieces were restituted. Since November 1996, the partly illustrated catalogue of 1947–1949 has been accessible online and completed. In 1997, Prime Minister Alain Juppé initiated the Mattéoli Commission, headed by Jean Mattéoli, to investigate the matter and according to the government, the Louvre is in charge of 678 pieces of artwork still unclaimed by their rightful owners. During the late 1990s, the comparison of the American war archives, which had not been done before, with the French and German ones as well as two court cases which finally settled some of the heirs' rights (Gentili di Giuseppe and Rosenberg families) allowed more accurate investigations. Since 1996, the restitutions, according sometimes to less formal criteria, concerned 47 more pieces (26 paintings, with 6 from the Louvre including a then displayed Tiepolo), until the last claims of French owners and their heirs ended again in 2006.

According to Serge Klarsfeld, since the now complete and constant publicity which the artworks got in 1996, the majority of the French Jewish community is nevertheless in favour of the return to the normal French civil rule of prescription acquisitive of any unclaimed good after another long period of time and consequently to their ultimate integration into the common French heritage instead of their transfer to foreign institutions like during World War II.

Napoleon's campaigns acquired Italian pieces by treaties, as war reparations, and Northern European pieces as spoils as well as some antiquities excavated in Egypt, though the vast majority of the latter were seized as war reparations by the British army and are now part of collections of the British Museum. On the other hand, the Dendera zodiac is, like the Rosetta Stone, claimed by Egypt even though it was acquired in 1821, before the Egyptian Anti-export legislation of 1835. The Louvre administration has thus argued in favor of retaining this item despite requests by Egypt for its return. The museum participates too in arbitration sessions held via UNESCO's Committee for Promoting the Return of Cultural Property to Its Countries of Origin. The museum consequently returned in 2009 five Egyptian fragments of frescoes (30 cm x 15 cm each) whose existence of the tomb of origin had only been brought to the authorities attention in 2008, eight to five years after their good-faith acquisition by the museum from two private collections and after the necessary respect of the procedure of déclassement from French public collections before the Commission scientifique nationale des collections des musées de France.

In 2011, over 130 international artists urged a boycott of the new Guggenheim museum as well as Louvre Abu Dhabi, citing reports, since 2009, of abuses of foreign construction workers on Saadiyat Island, including the arbitrary withholding of wages, unsafe working conditions, and failure of companies to pay or reimburse the steep recruitment fees being charged to laborers. According to Architectural Record, Abu Dhabi has comprehensive labor laws to protect the workers, but they are not conscientiously implemented or enforced. In 2010, the Guggenheim Foundation placed on its website a joint statement with Abu Dhabi’s Tourism Development and Investment Company (TDIC) recognizing the following workers' rights issues, among others: health and safety of the workers; their access to their passports and other documents that the employers have been retaining to guaranty that they stay on the job; using a general contractor that agrees to obey the labor laws; maintaining an independent site monitor; and ending the system that has been generally used in the Persian Gulf region of requiring workers to reimburse recruitment fees.

In 2013, The Observer reported that conditions for the workers at the Louvre and New York University construction sites on Saadiyat amounted to "modern-day slavery".Rosenbaum, Lee. "Guardian Exposé: Substandard Conditions Reportedly Persist for Some Abu Dhabi Construction Workers (plus Guggenheim's, TDIC's reactions) updated", CultureGrrl, ArtsJournal.com, December 24, 2013 In 2014, the Guggenheim's Director, Richard Armstrong, said that he believed that living conditions for the workers at the Louvre project were now good and that "many fewer" of them were having their passports confiscated. He stated that the main issue then remaining was the recruitment fees charged to workers by agents who recruit them.Kaminer, Ariel and Sean O'Driscoll. "Workers at N.Y.U.’s Abu Dhabi Site Faced Harsh Conditions", The New York Times, 18 May 2014 Later in 2014, the Guggenheim's architect, Gehry, commented that working with the Abu Dhabi officials to implement the law to improve the labor conditions at the museum's site is "a moral responsibility." He encouraged the TDIC to build additional worker housing and proposed that the contractor cover the cost of the recruitment fees. In 2012, TDIC engaged PricewaterhouseCoopers as an independent monitor required to issue reports every quarter. Labor lawyer Scott Horton told Architectural Record'' that he hoped the Guggenheim project will influence the treatment of workers on other Saadiyat sites and will "serve as a model for doing things right."

See also 

 Center for Research and Restoration of Museums of France
 List of museums in Paris
 Musée de la mode et du textile

References

Works cited

External links

 
Digital Collection
Louvre's 360x180 degree panorama virtual tour

 
1793 establishments in France
Archaeological museums in France
Art museums and galleries in Paris
Art museums established in 1793
Egyptological collections in France
History museums in France
Institut de France
Louvre Palace
Museums in Paris
Museums of ancient Greece in France
Museums of Ancient Near East in France
Museums of ancient Rome in France
National museums of France
Order of Arts and Letters of Spain recipients